The Adventures of Peregrine Pickle is a picaresque novel by the Scottish author Tobias Smollett, first published in 1751 and revised and published again in 1758. It tells the story of an egotistical man who experiences luck and misfortunes in the height of 18th-century European society.

Plot summary

The novel begins with the character of Peregrine as a young country gentleman rejected by his cruel mother, ignored by his indifferent father, and hated by his degenerate brother. After their alienation, he turns to Commodore Hawser Trunnion, who raises him.

Peregrine's detailed life experience provides a scope for Smollett's satire on human cruelty, stupidity, and greed: from his upbringing, education at Oxford, journey to France, jailing at the Fleet, and unexpected succession to his father's fortune and his final repentance and marriage to his beloved Emilia. The novel is written as a series of adventures, with every chapter depicting a new experience. The novel also contains a lengthy independent story called "The Memoirs of a Lady of Quality", written by Frances Vane, Viscountess Vane.

Peregrine Pickle features several amusing characters, most notably Commodore Hawser Trunnion, an old seaman and misogynist who lives in a house with his former shipmates. Trunnion's lifestyle may have inspired Charles Dickens to create the character of Wemmick in Great Expectations. Another interesting character is Peregrine's friend Cadwallader Crabtree, an old misanthrope who amuses himself by playing ingenious jokes on naive people.

Smollett also caricatured many of his enemies in the novel, most notably Henry Fielding and the actor David Garrick. Fitzroy Henry Lee was supposedly the model for Hawser Trunnion.

Criticism
George Orwell, writing in the Tribune in 1944, said regarding the novels Roderick Random and Peregrine Pickle:

"Peregrine devotes himself for months at a time to the elaborate and horribly cruel practical jokes in which the eighteenth century delighted. When, for instance, an unfortunate English painter is thrown into the Bastille for some trifling offence and is about to be released, Peregrine and his friends, playing on his ignorance of the language, let him think he has been sentenced to be broken on a wheel. A little later they tell him that his punishment has been commuted to castration. Why are these petty rogueries worth reading about? In the first place because they are funny. Secondly, by simply ruling out 'good' motives and showing no respect whatsoever for human dignity, Smollett attains a truthfulness that more serious novelists have missed."

Legacy
George P. Upton published the Letters of Peregrine Pickle in the Chicago Tribune from 1866 to 1869 as weekly letters and then in book forms.

References

External links

 The Adventures of Peregrine Pickle
 Peregrine Pickle, 1751

1751 novels
Novels by Tobias Smollett
Picaresque novels
Maritime books
1758 in Scotland
18th-century British novels
Novels first published in serial form